Ursuline College Chatham (UCC) is a Catholic secondary school in Chatham-Kent, Ontario, Canada. The secondary school offers both English and French immersion. Among a student community of about 1350, it is the biggest Catholic secondary school in Chatham-Kent. UCC celebrates more than 150 years of a rich custom of Catholic, Christian training and education. Angela Merici (1474-1540), the organizer of the Ursuline Sisters, was particularly intrigued by the education of children. One of her devotees, Mother Mary Xavier Le Bihan travelled from France to establish a minor pioneer township, Chatham. Referred to later as Ursuline College, this school for young ladies, from 1860 to 1971, attracted students from all across Canada, the United States, and Latin America. In 1972, the school became co-instructive and, in 1973, the school gave a Catholic secondary school training for young men and young ladies from all edges of Chatham-Kent.

See also
List of high schools in Ontario

References

External links
 http://www.st-clair.net/schools/ursuline/

High schools in Chatham-Kent
Catholic secondary schools in Ontario
Educational institutions established in 1912
1912 establishments in Ontario